The Gas and Electricity Act 1968 (1968 chapter 39) is an Act of the Parliament of the United Kingdom which extended the powers of the Gas Council, the Area Gas Boards and the Electricity Council to borrow money, including foreign currency, to meet their obligations; it permitted statutory gas and electricity bodies to render technical aid overseas; and allowed further member  appointments to the Electricity Council. The Act was principally in response to a rapid growth of the gas industry following the discovery of North Sea gas on the UK Continental Shelf in 1965.

Background 
The government recognised that there had been significant technological development in the gas industry since the first natural gas was discovered in the UK sector of the North Sea in 1965. This included major capital investments in onshore terminals and cross-country pipelines. It was envisaged that sales of gas would double by 1970/71 and double again by 1973. Both the gas and electricity industries had expressed an interest in borrowing capital in foreign currency markets. The expanded functions of the Gas Council had made it desirable for the Council membership to be increased. The Gas and Electricity Act 1968 addressed these issues and provided the necessary legal powers.

Gas and Electricity Act 1968 
The Gas and Electricity Act 1968 (1968 c. 39) received Royal Assent on 3 July 1968. Its long title is: ‘An Act to increase the statutory limits on the amounts outstanding in respect to borrowings by the Gas Council and Area Gas Boards; to provide for the borrowing by the Electricity Council, the Scottish Electricity Boards and the Gas Council of money in foreign currency; to enable the said Councils and Boards and other electricity authorities to furnish overseas aid; to increase the number of members of the Gas Council; and for connected purposes.’

Provisions 
The provisions of the Act comprise 8 Sections

 Section 1 extended the borrowing powers of Gas Council and Area Gas Boards to £1,600 million or a greater sum not exceeding £2,400, as sanctioned by the Minister. The Gas (Borrowing Powers) Act 1965 ceased to have effect,
 Section 2 Empowered the Electricity Council to borrow foreign currency by the issue of securities
 Section 3 Empowered the Scottish Electricity Boards to borrow foreign currency by the issue of securities
 Section 4 Empowered the Gas Council to borrow foreign currency by the issue of securities
 Section 5 Permitted the furnishing of foreign aid by the Electricity Council, the Central Electricity Board, an Area Electricity Board, the Gas Council, and an Area Gas Board.
 Section 6 Empowered the Minister to appoint two further members to the Gas Council
 Section 7 Interpretation
 Section 8 Short title

Consequences and later enactments 
As a consequence of Section 1(3)(a) of the 1968 Act the Gas (Borrowing Powers) Act 1965 ceased to have effect.

In 1969 the Electricity Council and the South of Scotland Electricity Board floated loans on the German market.

Sections 1, 4 and 6 of the 1968 Act were repealed by the Gas Act 1972.

The Act was repealed by the Electricity Act 1989 (Schedule 18).

See also 

 Oil and gas industry in the United Kingdom
 Gas Boards
 Gas Council
 British Gas
 Electricity Council

References 

United Kingdom Acts of Parliament 1968
Natural gas industry in the United Kingdom
Electric power in the United Kingdom